Children's Literature Association Quarterly is a quarterly academic journal established in 1975 and an official publication of the Children's Literature Association. It is published by the Johns Hopkins University Press. The journal promotes a scholarly approach to the study of children’s literature by printing theoretical articles and essays, as well as book reviews. The editor-in-chief is Katharine Capshaw Smith (University of Connecticut).

See also

Children's literature criticism
Children's literature periodicals

External links 
 
 Children’s Literature Association Quarterly  at Project MUSE

Children's literature criticism
Literary magazines published in the United States
Publications established in 1975
English-language journals
Johns Hopkins University Press academic journals